"I Can Hear Music" is a song written by Jeff Barry, Ellie Greenwich and Phil Spector for American girl group the Ronettes (credited as The Ronettes Featuring Veronica) in 1966.  This version spent one week on the Billboard Pop chart at number 100.  In early 1969, the Beach Boys released a cover version as a single from their album 20/20 (1969), peaking at number 24 in the US.

Cash Box said that "Ronnie sings a strong lead throughout the teen-oriented, emotion filled tune which is effectively backed by throbbing sounds."

The Beach Boys version

"I Can Hear Music" was covered by the American rock band the Beach Boys, released on their 1969 album 20/20 with Carl Wilson on lead vocals. This version peaked at No. 24 on the US Billboard Hot 100.  The song did best in Europe, reaching number 10 in the United Kingdom.

Within the US and Canada, it peaked on playlists in the top 5 in Boston, Houston and Dallas; No. 7 in New York and Chicago (WCFL); No. 8 in Toronto and San Diego, No. 9 in Seattle; No. 10 in Vancouver and Indianapolis; No. 11 in Los Angeles, Louisville, Providence, and Chicago (WLS); No. 12 in Milwaukee and Columbus.

Personnel
Credits from Craig Slowinski.

The Beach Boys
Al Jardine – backing vocals, handclaps
Mike Love – backing vocals, handclaps
Carl Wilson – lead vocals, guitar, bass, handclaps, producer, tambourine?
Dennis Wilson — drums, piano, handclaps
Bruce Johnston – backing vocals, Fender Rhodes electric piano, handclaps

Session musicians
Mike Kowalski - snare drum, sleigh bells

Chart history

Larry Lurex version

In 1973, Larry Lurex, the solo stage name of Freddie Mercury, recorded "I Can Hear Music."  His version peaked at #115 on the U.S. Billboard Bubbling Under the Hot 100 chart.

Kathy Trocolli version
In 1996, the Beach Boys rerecorded the song, with contemporary Christian singer Kathy Troccoli on lead vocals, for their country album Stars and Stripes Vol. 1.

References

External links
 
 

1966 songs
1966 singles
1969 singles
1973 singles
Songs written by Ellie Greenwich
Songs written by Jeff Barry
Songs written by Phil Spector
The Beach Boys songs
The Ronettes songs
Freddie Mercury songs
Philles Records singles
Song recordings with Wall of Sound arrangements
Capitol Records singles
Song recordings produced by Carl Wilson
Songs about music